Acanthametropus is a genus of mayflies in the family Acanthametropodidae. There are at least two described species in Acanthametropus.

Species
These two species belong to the genus Acanthametropus:
 Acanthametropus nikolskyi Tshernova, 1948
 Acanthametropus pecatonica (Burks, 1953)

References

Further reading

 
 
 

Mayfly genera
Taxonomy articles created by Polbot